Betty Price may refer to:

 Betty Price (arts advisor), executive director of the Oklahoma Arts Council
 Betty Price (politician), member of the Georgia House of Representatives